Destiny by Love is a 2013 Chinese romantic comedy television series produced by Alec Su, starring Su and Qin Lan as two unmarried people in their thirties. It is based on a popular online novel The New Leftover Woman Era (新剩女时代).

The series marks Su's production debut.

Cast 

 Alec Su
 Qin Lan
 Xiong Naijin
 Shaun Tam

References

External links
Destiny by Love on Viki

2013 Chinese television series debuts
2013 Chinese television series endings
Chinese romantic comedy television series
Television shows based on Chinese novels
Television series by Ciwen Media